The 2016 Copa Argentina Final was the 85th and final match of the 2015–16 Copa Argentina. It was played on December 15, 2016 at the Estadio Mario Alberto Kempes in Córdoba between River Plate and Rosario Central.  River Plate won the match 4–3. As champions, they qualified for 2017 Copa Libertadores and the 2016 Supercopa Argentina.

Qualified teams

Road to the final

Match details

Statistics

References

2016 in Argentine football
2015-16
2015–16 domestic association football cups
Copa Argentina Final 2016
Copa Argentina Final 2016